Ballajora Halt (Manx: Stadd Valley Joaree) is an intermediate stopping place on the northerly section of the Manx Electric Railway on the Isle of Man. It is in the parish of Maughold and is the nearest stop to the village of Maughold and its churchyard, known for its Celtic crosses.

Route

Also
Manx Electric Railway Stations

References

Sources
 Manx Manx Electric Railway Stopping Places (2002) Manx Electric Railway Society
 Island Island Images: Manx Electric Railway Pages (2003) Jon Wornham
 Official Tourist Department Page (2009) Isle Of Man Heritage Railways

Railway stations in the Isle of Man
Manx Electric Railway
Railway stations opened in 1899
1899 establishments in the Isle of Man